The discography of Amir Haddad, a French-Israeli singer-songwriter. His debut studio album, Vayehi, was released in 2011. Au cœur de moi, Haddad's second studio album, was released in April 2016, peaking at number six on the French Albums Chart. The album includes the singles "Oasis", "J'ai cherché", "On dirait" and "Au cœur de moi". In 2016 he was selected by France 2 to represent France at the Eurovision Song Contest 2016 in Stockholm, Sweden. His song, "J'ai cherché" was chosen internally by France 2 by a committee headed by entertainment director Nathalie André and the newly appointed French Head of Delegation for the Eurovision Song Contest Edoardo Grassi after having received 280 submissions. The entry was formally presented to the public on 12 March 2016 during the France 2 programme The DiCaire Show, hosted by Véronic DiCaire. The song finished 6th overall in the grand final with 257 points, France's best placing since 2002 and the country's highest-scoring entry in their contest history. Addictions, Haddad's third studio album, was released in October 2017, peaking at number three on the French Albums Chart. The album includes the singles "No Vacancy", "États d'Amour" and "Les rues de ma peine". The album was re-released in November 2018 and includes the singles "Longtemps" and "5 minutes avec toi". Ressources, Haddad's fourth studio album, was released in October 2020, peaking at number five on the French Albums Chart. The album includes the singles "La fête", "On verra bien" and "Carrousel".

Albums

Singles

As lead artist

As featured artist

Promotional singles

Other appearances

Music videos

Notes

References

External links
 

Discographies of French artists